Walter Beckett may refer to:

 Walter Beckett (composer) (1914–1996), Irish composer
 W. N. T. Beckett (1893–1941), English Navy officer